The Beautiful Adventure is a 1959 West German comedy film directed by Kurt Hoffmann and starring Liselotte Pulver, Robert Graf and Bruni Löbel.

It was shot at the Bavaria Studios in Munich. The film's sets were designed by the art director Robert Herlth.

Cast
 Liselotte Pulver as Dorothee Durand
 Robert Graf as Marius Bridot
 Bruni Löbel as Françoise
 Eva Maria Meineke as Cathérine
 Oliver Grimm as Pierre Bridot
 Heinrich Schweiger as César
 Horst Tappert as Frécon
 Edith Teichmann as Angelique
 Paul Esser as Olivon
 Alexander Hunzinger as Labise
 Karl Lieffen as Fotograf Fortuné Tallon
 Heinz-Leo Fischer as Pinatel
 Ernst Brasch as Esperandier
 Ralf Wolter as Taschendieb
 Karl Hanft as Gendarm Bombeau
 Max Wittmann
 Rudolf Rhomberg as Jules Tardy
 Otto Storr as Pfarrer
 Marie Ferron as Haushälterin des Pfarrers
 Edith Schollwer as Mutter von César
 Hans Clarin as Busfahrer Polyte
 Klaus Havenstein as Busfahrer Mapeaux
 Hans Baur as Schaffner
 Walter Karl Gussmann as Auskunftsbeamter #2
 Lisa Helwig as Nonne im Zug
 Klaus W. Krause as Auskunftsbeamter #1
 Henry Lorenzen as Feuerwerker
 Helmut Oeser as Vincent

References

Bibliography 
 Hans-Michael Bock and Tim Bergfelder. The Concise Cinegraph: An Encyclopedia of German Cinema. Berghahn Books, 2009.

External links 
 

1959 films
1959 comedy films
German comedy films
West German films
1950s German-language films
Films directed by Kurt Hoffmann 
Constantin Film films
Films shot at Bavaria Studios
Films set in France
Films about vacationing
1950s German films